Arsuk Heliport  is a heliport in Arsuk, a village in the Sermersooq municipality in southwestern Greenland. The heliport is considered a helistop because it does not have a terminal building.

Location and facilities

Airlines and destinations 

Arsuk Heliport is served by Air Greenland, which has seasonal regular flights to Qaqortoq Heliport. From there, Narsarsuaq Airport can be reached via the Narsaq Heliport.

References

Heliports in Greenland